Patrick Kevin Francis Michael Nevin (born 6 September 1963) is a Scottish former professional footballer who played as a winger. In a 20-year career, he appeared for Clyde, Chelsea, Everton, Tranmere Rovers, Kilmarnock and Motherwell. He won 28 caps for Scotland, scattered across a ten-year international career, and was selected for the UEFA Euro 1992 finals squad. Since retiring as a player, Nevin has worked as a chief executive of Motherwell and as a football writer and broadcaster.

Club career

Clyde
Nevin trained with Celtic as a youngster, but was rejected for being too small. He was signed by Clyde in 1981. In his first season, the club were promoted as Scottish Second Division champions; Nevin scored 14 goals in 30 starts and was voted SPFA Second Division Player of the Year. He scored six goals in 44 starts in his second season with the club.

He was inducted into the inaugural Clyde FC Hall of Fame in 2011.

Chelsea
Nevin arrived at Stamford Bridge in mid-1983 for £95,000, in a team managed by John Neal. Nevin's skill and pace made him a pivotal player at Chelsea and he very soon became firm favourite with the fans. In 1983–84, he scored 14 goals, created numerous others for the likes of Kerry Dixon and David Speedie and put in some dazzling performances – during a 4–0 win over Newcastle United, he tormented the opposition defence, leaving five defenders trailing in his wake – as Chelsea won promotion as Second Division champions. In the same season he was voted Chelsea's player of the year.

Chelsea finished a respectable sixth in the First Division and reached the League Cup semi-final in 1984–85. Nevin set up three goals in the quarter-final against Sheffield Wednesday as Chelsea came back from 3–0 down to draw 4–4, and he set up the winning goal scored by David Speedie in the replay. The club were in the title race for much of the 1985–86, with Nevin scoring a late equaliser against Liverpool at Anfield and a crucial header against West Ham United to seal a 2–1 win. A late collapse saw Chelsea finish sixth after being in the title race for most of the season.

The club's performances dropped and they finished 14th in 1986–87, though Nevin was again voted Chelsea player of the year. They were relegated a year later.

Everton
Chelsea were relegated in 1988 and Nevin was sold to Everton. He scored 20 goals in 138 appearances for the club, but struggled to re-capture his previous form with manager Colin Harvey adopting a far more rigid system. He helped the side reach the FA Cup final in 1989, scoring the winner against Norwich City in the semi-final, but they lost 3–2 in the final to arch-rivals Liverpool.

Howard Kendall returned to the club as manager in November 1990; he and Nevin openly disagreed with each other, which reduced Nevin's playing opportunities, as did the arrival of new wingers Robert Warzycha and Mark Ward.

Nevin was unfortunate to arrive at Everton just after one of the finest spells in their history, when they had collected two league titles, an FA Cup and the European Cup Winners' Cup. In contrast, Nevin's four seasons at the club saw a runners-up medal in the FA Cup (1989) being the closest he came to being part of a trophy winning side, and they never finished higher than sixth in the league (1990).

Tranmere Rovers
Nevin spent time on loan with fellow Merseyside club Tranmere Rovers, then in the second tier of English football, before signing permanently in 1992. The club competed in the Division One play-offs in three consecutive seasons (1992–93, 1993–94 and 1994–95) but on each occasion they were eliminated in the semi-final.

Return to Scotland
In 1997, Nevin returned to Scotland and played for Kilmarnock and later Motherwell before retiring in 2000.

International career
In 1982 while playing for Clyde, Nevin travelled to Finland to play for the Scotland U18 team at the UEFA European Youth Championship and was named player of the tournament after helping Scotland win it. The following year, he starred for the Scotland U20 team that reached the quarter-finals of the FIFA World Youth Championship.

Nevin won 28 caps for the Scottish national side, making his debut against Romania in 1986. He scored five goals in a ten-year international career and played at Euro 92, but was not selected in the final squads for the 1986 or 1990 World Cups. He made his final appearance for Scotland in 1996 but did not appear at the Euro 96 finals.

Post-playing career
After retiring as a player, Nevin became chief executive of Motherwell. He resigned in April 2002, after Motherwell chairman John Boyle put the club into administration due to financial problems.

He works as a football pundit on television and radio. Nevin co-wrote a book, In Ma Head, Son, with psychologist Dr George Sik. It explores Nevin's worries, motivation and troubles during the 1996–97 season at Tranmere Rovers as he neared the end of his playing career.

He has an arts degree from Glasgow Caledonian University. His interest in literature, the arts, and his musical taste distinguishes him from many of his peers. He preferred The Fall and Joy Division to Phil Collins or Lionel Richie. He was interviewed by music magazine NME and was a guest music presenter on Radio City during his Everton and Tranmere career.
 
At the second Bowlie Weekender, hosted by ATP he played a DJ set, playing Belle & Sebastian, Orange Juice and "My New House" by The Fall while wearing a The Pains of Being Pure at Heart T-shirt. The following day he slipped an indiepop reference onto 5 Live while talking about the Man Utd vs Arsenal match. He has also appeared as a guest DJ at Scared To Dance and How Does It Feel To Be Loved?, which are both indiepop club nights in London. He makes a guest appearance on the 1986 Ted Chippington / Vindaloo Summer Special (with Robert Lloyd & The Nightingales and Fuzzbox) video of "Rockin With Rita".

In 2010, Nevin signed as a non-playing substitute for new club Chester after Colin Murray of BBC Radio 5 live offered the new club £2,000 if they named Nevin and Perry Groves as unused substitutes at every game in the 2010–11 season. This was live on 'Kicking off with Colin Murray', a show Nevin has appeared on every week since the start of the 2009–10 season.

Personal life
Nevin grew up supporting Celtic. He switched his support to Hibernian after feeling that his boyhood club had become a large corporate organisation and the Celtic Park stadium no longer felt like home. Another reason was Celtic fans chanting IRA songs. He also supports his former club Chelsea, and writes a weekly column for the Chelsea website. Nevin lives in Duns, Scottish Borders, a small town in the Scottish Borders with his wife and two children. His daughter, also a keen sports player, was a Scottish champion in badminton. He received an honorary degree from Abertay University in 2012. Nevin is the cousin of the retired English footballer Terry Butcher. In 2021 Nevin wrote and released his autobiography.

Career statistics

Scores and results list Scotland's goal tally first, score column indicates score after each Nevin goal.

Honours
Clyde
Scottish Second Division: 1981–82

Chelsea
Full Members Cup: 1985–86
Football League Second Division: 1983–84

Everton
FA Cup Runner-up: 1988–89
Full Members Cup Runner-up: 1988–89, 1990–91

Kilmarnock
Ayrshire Cup: 1997–98

Scotland
 Rous Cup Runner-up: 1986, 1989
UEFA U18 Championship: 1982

Individual
SPFA Second Division Player of the Year: 1981–82
UEFA U18 Championship Best Player: 1982
Chelsea Player of the Year: 1983–84, 1986–87
Tranmere Rovers Hall of Fame: Inducted, 2010
Gwladys Street's Hall of Fame: Inducted, 2012
Clyde Hall of Fame: Inducted, 2012

References

External links
Clyde FC Hall of Fame profile
Chelsea FC Legends profile
Everton FC profile
Profile from BBC Press Office
Pat Nevin on the Chelsea in America Celebrity Podcast (2009).

1963 births
Living people
Footballers from Glasgow
Association football wingers
Scottish footballers
Scotland international footballers
Scotland B international footballers
UEFA Euro 1992 players
Clyde F.C. players
Chelsea F.C. players
Everton F.C. players
Tranmere Rovers F.C. players
Kilmarnock F.C. players
Motherwell F.C. players
Motherwell F.C. non-playing staff
Scottish Football League players
English Football League players
Scottish Premier League players
Scottish people of Irish descent
Scottish chief executives
Scottish association football commentators
Scotland under-21 international footballers
FA Cup Final players